The Cetruminantia are a clade made up of the Cetancodontamorpha (or Whippomorpha) and their closest living relatives, the Ruminantia.

Cetruminantia's placement within Artiodactyla can be represented in the following cladogram:

Classification

Order Artiodactyla (even-toed ungulates)
Tylopoda (camelids)
Artiofabula (ruminants, pigs, peccaries, whales, and dolphins)
Suina (pigs and peccaries) 
Cetruminantia (ruminants, whales, and dolphins)
Suborder Ruminantia (antelope, buffalo, cattle, goats, sheep, deer, giraffes, and chevrotains)
Family Antilocapridae (pronghorn)
Family Bovidae, 135 species (antelope, bison, buffalo, cattle, goats, and sheep)
Family Cervidae, 55~94 species (deer, elk, and moose)
Family Giraffidae, 2 species (giraffes, okapis)
Family Moschidae, 4~7 species (musk deer)
Family Tragulidae, 6~10 species (chevrotains, or mouse deer)
Suborder Whippomorpha (aquatic or semi-aquatic even-toed ungulates)
Infraorder Acodonta
Family Hippopotamidae, 2 species (hippopotamuses)
Infraorder Cetacea (whales, dolphins, and porpoises)
Mysticeti (baleen whales)
Family Balaenidae, 2~4 species (right whales and bowhead whales)
Family Balaenopteridae, 6~9 species (rorquals)
Family Eschrichtiidae, 1 species (gray whale)
Family Neobalaenidae, 1 species (pygmy right whale)
Odontoceti (toothed whales, dolphins, and porpoises)
Superfamily Delphinoidea (dolphins, arctic whales, porpoises, and relatives)
Family Delphinidae, 38 species (dolphins, killer whales, and relatives)
Family Monodontidae, 2 species (beluga and narwhal)
Family Phocoenidae, 6 species (porpoises)
Superfamily Physeteroidea (sperm whales)
Family Kogiidae, 2 species (pygmy and dwarf sperm whales)
Family Physeteridae, 1 species (common sperm whale)
Superfamily Ziphoidea (beaked whales)
Family Ziphidae, 22 species (modern beaked whales)
Superfamily Platanistoidea (river dolphins)
Family Iniidae, 1~3 species (South American river dolphin(s))
Family Lipotidae, 1 species (baiji or Chinese river dolphin)
Family Platanistidae, 1~2 species (Asian river dolphin(s))
Family Pontoporiidae, 1 species (La Plata dolphin)

References

 
Artiofabula
Phylogenetics